Avra is a populated place situated in Pima County, Arizona, United States, one of two populated places in Arizona with this same name, the other located in Pinal County.

History
Avra's population was estimated as 100 in 1940.

References

Populated places in Pima County, Arizona